John Hart (born February 1, 1932, Denver, Colorado) is a retired American television journalist who worked for several different television networks during the 1960s through the 1990s.

Career
First known to the American public as a correspondent for CBS News, Hart eventually became anchor of CBS Morning News program, broadcast from 1969 until 1973. Hart moved to NBC in 1975 where, in addition to general correspondent duties, he served as a substitute for John Chancellor as anchor of NBC Nightly News and anchor of NBC Nightly News weekend editions during much of the 1970s. He stayed with that network until 1988, when The Christian Science Monitor hired him as anchor of its cable television newscast, World Monitor, which aired on The Discovery Channel 1988–1991. He retired in 1991.  

Among Hart's awards were Peabody, Overseas Press Club, Weintal, Edward R. Murrow, Christopher, ACE, Emmy.

He received a B.A. degree from Westmont College in Santa Barbara, California, in 1953. From 1954 to 1956 he served in the U.S. Army. From 1956 to 1960 he worked at WCCO-TV in Minneapolis; WSJV in Elkhart, Indiana; and KPOL radio in Los Angeles. While there he received his M.A. degree in journalism from UCLA (1959).

From 1960 to 1964 he was a writer/reporter for KNXT in Los Angeles. In 1964 he became bureau manager and correspondent of the CBS-owned television station news bureau in Washington, D.C. During 1965–1966 he covered the South for CBS News, followed by a six-month assignment in Vietnam. During 1968 he covered the presidential campaigns of Robert Kennedy and Richard Nixon.

Hart joined NBC News as a political correspondent in February 1975, serving in the Washington, D.C. bureau. In January 1977 he became the national affairs correspondent. In November 1979 he was named chief European correspondent, based in London. That month he interviewed Ayatollah Ruhollah Khomeini of Iran.

References
"Khomeini Interview: Networks Face Ethics Issue," New York Times, November 19, 1979

External links
 Transcript of August 1970 interview of President Richard Nixon (with Bernard Kalb) for CBS
 

American television reporters and correspondents
American television news anchors
American male journalists
NBC News people
1932 births
Living people
Journalists from Colorado
CBS News people

20th-century American journalists
The Christian Science Monitor people